Moon Geun-young (born May 6, 1987) is a South Korean actress. Affectionately called the "Nation's Little Sister", Moon began modeling at the age of 10, then made her acting debut in 1999 as a child actress. She first rose to stardom through her role as the young Eun-suh in the hugely popular television drama series Autumn in My Heart (2000), followed by a well-received turn in Kim Jee-woon's critically acclaimed horror film A Tale of Two Sisters (2003). Moon solidified her star status by headlining the box-office hits My Little Bride (2004) and Innocent Steps (2005). At age 21, she became the youngest recipient of a Grand Prize ("Daesang") which she won at SBS Drama Awards for the television series Painter of the Wind (2008).

Career

Early career
Before her acting debut on a television drama series, Moon filmed several commercials and modeled for various magazines. She started modeling at the age of 12, and first appeared onscreen on the 1999 documentary drama On the Road directed by Choi Jae-eun. Moon's rise to fame came in 2000 when she starred as the younger counterpart of Song Hye-kyo's character in the pan-Asia hit drama Autumn in My Heart.
She won the Best Young Actress award at the 2000 KBS Drama Awards for her role, together with her co-star Choi Woo-hyuk.

Following her early success, she returned to the screen in 2001 as the young Empress Myeongseong (Lee Mi-yeon played the adult version) in the historical drama Empress Myeongseong. In 2002, Moon made her film debut in Lovers' Concerto, playing a supporting role as Cha Tae-hyun's younger sister.

Breakthrough
Moon was launched as a major star with her role in Kim Jee-woon's critically acclaimed horror film A Tale of Two Sisters (2003). A Tale of Two Sisters ranks among the highest-grossing Korean horror films and was the first to be screened in American theaters.

In 2004, Moon headlined the romantic comedy film My Little Bride. It was the second most popular Korean film of the year, behind the blockbuster hit Taegukgi. In the film, Moon plays an ordinary high school girl who has to marry an older man (played by Kim Rae-won) due to a pact their grandfathers made during the Korean War. Following the release of My Little Bride, the press gave Moon the title "Nation's Little Sister".

In 2005, Moon starred in Innocent Steps where she played the role of an ethnic Korean living in China, who finds herself to be a complete fish out of water after moving to South Korea. Innocent Steps was a hit, and its success along with My Little Bride established Moon as a genuine box office draw. That year, Moon ranked first among actresses in the Korean film industry as the most bankable star. Moon and actor Cho Seung-woo also received the 2005 Good Model award from the Korea Advertisers Association; 200 members voted for the winners based on how much they contributed to boosting the sales of products and enhancing the image of advertisers.

In 2006, Moon starred in Love Me Not, a Korean big-screen remake of popular Japanese TV drama Ai nante iranee yo, natsu ("I Don't Need Love, Summer"), where she played a cold-hearted blind heiress. Later that year, Moon and veteran actor Ahn Sung-ki hosted the 2006 Pusan International Film Festival (PIFF), the biggest international film festival in South Korea.

Acting acclaim
In 2008, Moon returned to television in the period epic Painter of the Wind, where she played the lead role of Shin Yun-bok, a painter who disguises herself as a man and becomes mentored by the master Kim Hong-do (played by Park Shin-yang). Shin was a real-life historical figure, a painter who lived during the Joseon Dynasty (1392-1910) and was known for his realistic and delicate depictions of daily life. Moon received acting acclaim for her performance, including Best Actress at the 2008 Grimae Awards (presented by the Korean Broadcasting Directors Association), Best TV Actress at the 45th Baeksang Arts Awards, and the Daesang ("Grand Prize") at the 2008 SBS Drama Awards, making her the youngest recipient of a Daesang in the drama awards history of all three networks.
In 2010, Moon starred in Cinderella's Sister, a modern fairy tale retelling of the contentious relationship between two stepsisters (opposite Seo Woo). Later in the year, she starred in the romantic comedy Mary Stayed Out All Night alongside Jang Keun-suk. 2010 also marked the year she made her theater debut, in the Korean staging of Patrick Marber's play Closer. She caused a stir as the strip dancing, promiscuous Alice, opposite Um Ki-joon's Dan.

Moon returned to TV, playing a struggling young designer in Cheongdam-dong Alice (2012). She then starred in Goddess of Fire (2013), playing Yoo Jung, a character based on Baek Pa-sun, the first female potter and porcelain artist of the Joseon Dynasty. This is her second historical drama (or sageuk), five years after Painter of the Wind.

Moon made her long-awaited return to the big screen in Lee Joon-ik's period film The Throne, in which she played Lady Hyegyeong, the wife of Crown Prince Sado. This is followed by the mystery thriller series The Village: Achiara's Secret.

In 2016, Moon starred in her second theater play, Romeo and Juliet alongside Park Jung-min. She was also cast in the mystery film Glass Garden, which premiered at the Busan International Film Festival in 2017.

In 2019, Moon was confirmed to make her small-screen comeback in the tvN's crime drama Catch the Ghost.

In 2022, Moon signed a contract with Cree Company.

Personal life
Moon graduated from Gwangju Gukje High School in February 2006. In March 2006, she entered Sungkyunkwan University in Seoul. Moon was known for being a diligent student and has a solid attendance record, a rarity among Korean celebrities in college. She studied Korean Language and Literature.

Their agencies confirmed that Moon dated her Goddess of Fire co-star Kim Bum for seven months, from October 2013 to April 2014. Not long after agencies of both actors confirmed the news stating: "They did break up not too long ago but have decided to remain good friends and supportive colleagues".

Moon was diagnosed with compartment syndrome, and received emergency treatments to treat her arm muscle pain.

Charity

Morning Reading
Moon made the contributions secretly through her mother, Ryu Seon-young, but her good deeds became known when Morning Reading revealed its 2007 account information online.

Haenam Children's Center
Bae Yo-seop opened an after-school study room for children from poor or single-parent families to study there for free in 2002. The program was facing closure in October 2006 when the landlord told Bae that the house would be sold. A new building, equipped with library, computer room, bathhouse and dining room was built on the land, and the  expense was also covered by Moon. Moon also paid an unannounced visit to their classrooms.

Community Chest of Korea
Moon had wanted to remain an anonymous donor, but the organization was pressured by a media frenzy to identify her. Her donations were used to build children's libraries and subsidize hospital costs for children suffering from leukemia or cancer. Apart from the Community Chest of Korea, Moon has also given several hundred millions of won to scholarship foundations.

Because of her charitable activities, particularly for the Community Chest of Korea, Moon was selected among 100 people that "lit up the world" in 2008 in a survey conducted by the Korea Green Foundation.

Hangeul Library in Sydney
Moon again showed her generosity by building a Korean library for young Korean expatriates in Australia. Working with the Lindfield Korean School in Sydney, the actress donated  towards construction of a permanent Korean library (called the Hangeul Library) and also donated 10,000 books to over 40 Korean schools scattered across the city. Moon has been donating books with her own money since 2006, when she saw during a visit to her relatives in Australia how young Korean students there did not have enough books or places to learn Korean.

Donated Haenam Children's Center to NGO Group
In April 2009, Moon donated the Haenam Children's Center to be used as a study room for poor students to the NGO group Good People, an international charity group of UN UCOSCO special consultative status aiming to improve self-sustainability and eradicate extreme poverty through restoration of self-esteem using the principles of human dignity and equality at a global level.

Filmography

Film

As an actor

As a director

Television series

Web series

Variety show

Theater

Discography

Awards and nominations

Listicles

References

External links
 Moon Geun-young at Namoo Actors
 
 
 

21st-century South Korean actresses
South Korean television actresses
South Korean film actresses
South Korean stage actresses
South Korean child actresses
South Korean Buddhists
Sungkyunkwan University alumni
People from Gwangju
Living people
1987 births
Best Actress Paeksang Arts Award (television) winners